Three athletes from India qualified for the 2014 Winter Olympics in Sochi, Russia held between 7 and 23 February 2014. They initially entered the competition as Independent Olympic Participants due to the ongoing suspension of India's national olympic committee (NOC), the Indian Olympic Association since 2012. However, on 11 February 2014, the IOC reinstated India's NOC, allowing two athletes, Himanshu Thakur and Nadeem Iqbal, who still had pending events to compete under the Indian flag.

Background
India's National Olympic Committee, the Indian Olympic Association, was suspended by the International Olympic Committee due to government interference in the autonomy of the country's NOC in December 2012. It was announced on 31 December 2013 that India would be competing under the Olympic flag in Sochi. Elections by the Indian Olympic Association were scheduled two days after the opening ceremony, which would not provide enough time for the suspension to be lifted. The IOC ultimately reinstated the Indian Olympic Association on 11 February after Narayana Ramachandran, the president of the World Squash Federation, was voted in as its new president. While Shiva Keshavan had already competed in his events as an Independent Olympic Participant at 2014 Olympics, Himanshu Thakur and Nadeem Iqbal, who still had their events pending were able to compete for India; this was the first time such a reinstatement of a NOC occurred as an Olympic Games were underway.

Competitors
The following is the list of number of competitors participating in the delegation per sport.

Alpine skiing

According to the final quota allocation released on 20 January 2014, India had one athlete in qualification position. Himanshu Thakur eventually competed under the Indian flag and finished the giant slalom competition in last place out of the competitors who finished the race.

Cross-country skiing

According to the final quota allocation released on 20 January 2014, India had one athlete in qualification position. Nadeem Iqbal became the first athlete from Jammu and Kashmir to qualify for the Winter Olympics. Iqbal eventually competed under the Indian flag and finished the race in 85th position (out of 87 competitors who completed the race) nearly 17 minutes behind the winner Dario Cologna of Switzerland.

References

External links 
Independent Olympic participants
 
 
India
 
 India at the 2014 Winter Olympics at SR/Olympics (archive)

Nations at the 2014 Winter Olympics
2014
2014 in Indian sport
2014